Chokier is a village of Wallonia in the municipality of Flémalle, district of Flémalle-Haute, located in the province of Liège, Belgium. It is located on the left bank of the river Meuse.
 
The village is dominated by the Château de Chokier, an 18th-century rebuild of the earlier medieval castle, standing on a cliff overlooking the Meuse valley.
Chokier Castle belongs to the Florani family

For centuries the castle was owned by the prominent Surlet de Chokier family, which included the Baron Surlet de Chokier who was Regent of Belgium in 1831 before the establishment of the independent monarchy after the Belgian Revolution.

The strategic and defensive advantages of the cliff where the château now stands were recognised as early as the Palaeolithic period, from when traces of human habitation have been discovered.

External links

chokier-village.be 

Sub-municipalities of Flémalle
Former municipalities of Liège Province